The following highways are numbered 54:

Canada
 Alberta Highway 54
 Saskatchewan Highway 54

Finland
 Finnish national road 54

India
 National Highway 54 (India)

Italy
 Autostrada A54

Japan
 Japan National Route 54

Korea, South
National Route 54

Mexico
 Mexican Federal Highway 54

New Zealand
 New Zealand State Highway 54

Philippines
  N54 highway (Philippines)

Turkey
  , a motorway in Turkey as the half ring road in Gaziantep.

United Kingdom
 British A54 (Buxton-Chester)
 British M54 (Wellington-Essington)

United States
 U.S. Route 54
 Alabama State Route 54
 Arkansas Highway 54
 California State Route 54
 Delaware Route 54
 Florida State Road 54
 County Road 54 (Pasco County, Florida)
 Georgia State Route 54
 Georgia State Route 54B (former)
 Idaho State Highway 54
 Illinois Route 54
 Indiana State Road 54
 Kentucky Route 54
 Louisiana Highway 54
 Maryland Route 54
 M-54 (Michigan highway)
 Minnesota State Highway 54
 County Road 54 (Anoka County, Minnesota)
Missouri Route 54 (1922) (former)
 Nebraska Highway 54 (former)
 Nebraska Spur 54B
 Nebraska Spur 54D
 Nebraska Recreation Road 54C
 Nebraska Recreation Road 54F
 Nevada State Route 54 (former)
 New Jersey Route 54
 County Route 54 (Bergen County, New Jersey)
 County Route 54 (Monmouth County, New Jersey)
 New York State Route 54
 County Route 54 (Cayuga County, New York)
 County Route 54 (Chautauqua County, New York)
 County Route 54 (Chemung County, New York)
 County Route 54 (Dutchess County, New York)
 County Route 54 (Franklin County, New York)
 County Route 54 (Jefferson County, New York)
 County Route 54 (Lewis County, New York)
 County Route 54 (Orange County, New York)
 County Route 54 (Oswego County, New York)
 County Route 54 (Otsego County, New York)
 County Route 54 (Putnam County, New York)
 County Route 54 (Rensselaer County, New York)
 County Route 54 (Saratoga County, New York)
 County Route 54 (Schoharie County, New York)
 County Route 54 (St. Lawrence County, New York)
 County Route 54 (Suffolk County, New York)
 County Route 54 (Tioga County, New York)
 County Route 54 (Ulster County, New York)
 County Route 54 (Washington County, New York)
 County Route 54 (Westchester County, New York)
 County Route 54 (Wyoming County, New York)
 North Carolina Highway 54
 North Dakota Highway 54
 Ohio State Route 54
 Oklahoma State Highway 54
 Pennsylvania Route 54
 South Dakota Highway 54 (former)
 Tennessee State Route 54
 Texas State Highway 54
 Texas Park Road 54
 Utah State Route 54
 Utah State Route 54 (1931-1969) (former)
 Virginia State Route 54
 West Virginia Route 54
 Wisconsin Highway 54

Territories
 Puerto Rico Highway 54
 Puerto Rico Highway 54R

See also
List of highways numbered 54A
A54